The Dhimalish languages, Dhimal and Toto, are a small group of Sino-Tibetan languages spoken in Nepal, Bhutan, and the Jalpaiguri division of West Bengal, India.

Classification
Hammarström, et al. note in Glottolog that Dhimalish is best considered to be a separate Sino-Tibetan branch rather than as a subgroup of Brahmaputran (Sal), and consider Dhimalish as failing to show sufficient Brahmaputran diagnostic vocabulary. Sotrug (2015) considers Dhimalish to be particularly closely related to the Kiranti languages rather than to the Sal languages.

Grollmann & Gerber (2017) consider Lhokpu to have a particularly close relationship with Dhimal and Toto.

Gerber & Grollmann (2018) group Dhimal, Toto, and Lhokpu within Central-Eastern Kiranti.

Comparative vocabulary
Sanyal (1973:77-81) provides a comparative word list of Toto from Sunder (1895) and George Abraham Grierson's Linguistic Survey of India, and Dhimal from Brian Houghton Hodgson.

See also
 Dhimalish comparative vocabulary list (Wiktionary)

References

 George van Driem (2001) Languages of the Himalayas: An Ethnolinguistic Handbook of the Greater Himalayan Region.  Brill: Boston 
 Sanyal, Charu Chandra. 1973. "The Totos: A sub-Himalayan tribe." In The Meches and the Totos, 1-81. Darjeeling: University of North Bengal.

Kiranti languages
Languages of India
Languages of Nepal